The 2006 United States Senate election in Washington was held November 7, 2006. Incumbent Democrat Maria Cantwell won reelection to a second term.

Background 
The filing deadline was July 28, 2006, with the primary held September 19, 2006. Cantwell consistently led in polling throughout the race, although political analysts saw her as vulnerable this election cycle due to her extremely narrow win in 2000 and discontent among progressive voters. In November, the National Journal ranked Cantwell's seat as number 13 of the top 20 races to watch based on the likelihood of switching party control, and the third-highest Democratic seat likely to flip. However, in an election marked by discontent over the Republican leadership in D.C., Cantwell easily won by a 17% margin of victory.

Statewide politics in Washington have been dominated by the Democratic Party for many years. The governor, lieutenant governor, treasurer, state auditor, and insurance commissioner are Democrats, while only secretary of state, attorney general, and commissioner of public lands are Republican. Of the nine representatives Washington sends to the House of Representatives, six are Democrats. Democrat Patty Murray is the state's senior senator. Cantwell won her initial election to the Senate in 2000 over Slade Gorton by 2,229 votes. Due to the closeness of that race, and the close gubernatorial contest between Democrat Christine Gregoire and Republican Dino Rossi in November 2004, many Republicans believed they had a strong chance of capturing Cantwell's seat in 2006.

Democratic primary

Candidates 
 Maria Cantwell, incumbent U.S. senator
 Michael Goodspaceguy Nelson, perennial candidate
 Mike The Mover, moving company owner and perennial candidate
 Mohammad Said, candidate for the U.S. Senate in 2004
 Hong Tran, attorney
 Mark Wilson, Libertarian candidate for Congress in 2002 and Green candidate for the U.S. Senate in 2004 (withdrew and took a paid position in Cantwell's campaign)

Campaign 
On March 9, 2006, Aaron Dixon announced his decision to seek the Green Party's nomination for U.S. Senate, challenging Cantwell on her continued support for the U.S. presence in Iraq and the USA PATRIOT Act. On May 13, 2006, Dixon secured the party's nomination at the Green Party of Washington state's Spring Convention.

Initially, Cantwell had two challengers from within the Democratic primary, both of them taking strong stances against the Iraq war that brought attention to Cantwell's votes for the Iraq Resolution and against a timeline for withdrawal:  Mark Wilson and Hong Tran.  Three other Democrats also entered the primary race: Mike the Mover, Michael Goodspaceguy Nelson, and Mohammad H. Said.

On August 8, 2006, the incumbent Democratic Senator from Connecticut, Joe Lieberman, lost his primary race to challenger Ned Lamont by 52%-48%, and appears to be following through on his earlier commitment to run as an Independent in the general election. A great deal of attention has focused on this race, as an early barometer of both anti-incumbent and anti-war sentiment nationwide. Comparisons have been made between Lieberman's troubles and Cantwell's re-election bid, citing Cantwell's vote in favor of the Iraq Resolution that led to the war, her refusal to say she regretted the vote, and her vote against a timetable for withdrawal.

Unlike Lamont's campaign, Cantwell's anti-war opponents' campaigns have received much less funding and have not had the same support from the blogosphere that brought Lamont to prominence and improved his name recognition. Also, unlike Lieberman, Cantwell has altered her position on the war during her campaign and criticized the Bush Administration for its conduct of the war. She also hired her most vocal anti-war primary opponent, Mark Wilson, at $8,000-a-month salary, a move that was described by political commentators as "buying out" the opposition (which she also allegedly attempted with other anti-war challengers Hong Tran and Aaron Dixon). The article does, however, note that, despite the differences in exact circumstances, the Lieberman defeat also shows that voters are in an anti-incumbent mood, which could create problems for Cantwell. This is supported by another P-I article that also notes that the primary loss of Lieberman and two House incumbents, Michigan Republican Joe Schwarz and Georgia Democrat Cynthia McKinney, on the same day indicates that there may be a nationwide anti-incumbent trend.

Following the primary results, Cantwell endorsed Ned Lamont and McGavick responded by endorsing Senator Lieberman. The Dixon campaign released a statement criticizing Cantwell's "spin and vague rhetoric" on the war, and equating her current position to a pro-war stance similar to Lieberman's.

On August 14, less than a week after Lamont's win and nearly four years after the actual event, Cantwell for the first time said she would have voted against the authorization to use force in Iraq if she knew then what she knows today. However, she did so only after hearing her opponent McGavick say that he would have voted against the authorization under those conditions. Cantwell has stated that she had no regrets for her vote in favor of the authorization and has not changed that position.

On July 9, anti-war challenger Mark Wilson announced he would abandon his bid, endorse Cantwell, and take a paid position offered by Cantwell's campaign, one day after progressive activist and anti-war critic Dal LaMagna had been hired to be the Cantwell campaign's co-chair.  Initially, Cantwell's campaign refused to state how much they were paying Wilson, but under pressure from the media, disclosed that he was receiving $8,000 per month, only slightly less than Cantwell's campaign manager Matt Butler, who earns $8,731 per month. The next day, Hong Tran received a call from LaMagna saying they would like her to join their campaign, in a context that she interpreted as a job offer, which she refused. Political commentators, including those at the Seattle Post-Intelligencer and one at The Washington Times, expressed their views that Cantwell was attempting to eliminate the viable options anti-war Democrats had to voice their opinion on the war in the upcoming primary by having Wilson join her campaign and then soliciting Tran.

Wilson's supporters and journalists expressed surprise at his withdrawal from the race after a 16-month campaign, where he was a sharp critic of the incumbent Senator, who he referred to on his campaign website as a "free-trading corporate elitist" who "bought her seat", then "alienated and alarmed" her base. When asked by reporters if he still believed what he said about Cantwell during his primary bid, he stated: "I believed in it to a point in order to capitalize on what was already existent, which was a rift within the Democratic Party over the issue of the war." Both Dixon and Tran have publicly doubted that Wilson's apparent change of heart was genuine, citing his paid position with the campaign and his initial refusal to disclose his salary.

On September 25, Joshua Frank reported that Dixon was alleging that he had been contacted twice in July by Mark Wilson, who implied that large donations to Dixon's non-profit organization, Central House, would be made if he were to withdraw his candidacy before filing. Dixon also claimed that Wilson was not the only Cantwell staffer to contact him, but declined to disclose who the other staff was.  Dixon also made this claim on a Democracy Now! broadcast. David Postman of the Seattle Times contacted the Cantwell campaign about the allegations; their spokesperson didn't say it didn't happen, but stated that no one on the campaign had authorized to speak to Dixon about his campaign. The campaign did not allow access to Wilson so he could respond as to whether the conversation took place. Other reporters also have had trouble contacting Wilson in recent weeks; Susan Paynter of the Seattle P-I, in an article on his shunning of the media, noted that there had been a widespread assumption after Wilson's hire that the intent was to silence him and that his disappearance only reinforced this assumption, calling it "the political equivalent of a farm subsidy." Paynter also quoted Hong Tran as saying that the reaction to Wilson's initial appearances on the campaign trail after he had joined Cantwell were so negative that she was not surprised he disappeared.

While some of Washington's legislative districts did not give endorsements for the primary election, Cantwell received the sole endorsement of at least fourteen of the forty-nine legislative districts in the state. Hong Tran won the sole endorsement of one district, the 32nd (Cantwell's home district), and split dual endorsements with Cantwell in three others: the 40th, 25th, and 26th. Tran attended the endorsement meeting for the 32nd Legislative District in person and, according to one blogger who claims to have spoken to people who attended the meeting, made her positions clear and responded to questions.  According to the blogger, Cantwell sent Mark Wilson in her stead, who was unable to defend Cantwell's votes in favor of the USA PATRIOT Act, NAFTA, CAFTA, and the Iraq War.

On September 19, after her defeat in the Democratic primary, Hong Tran lamented to the Seattle Times of "how undemocratic the Democratic Party really is" saying the state Democratic party had tried to keep her from getting attention, forbidding her from putting up signs at Coordinated Campaign events and not giving her access to the state party voter rolls. Cantwell, whose campaign hired two of her early critics, had also refused to debate Tran. When asked before the primary whether she would endorse the senator if her primary bid proved unsuccessful, Tran had responded, "certainly not."

Polling

Results 

From the Washington Secretary of State

Republican primary

Background 
In early hypothetical matchups in 2005 compiled by conservative pollster Strategic Vision, Rossi led Cantwell.  Republican leadership reportedly pleaded with Rossi to jump into the ring. Rossi declined.

Speculation next centered on Rick White (who had taken Cantwell's House seat in 1994), state GOP chair Chris Vance, former Seattle television reporter Susan Hutchison, and former 8th district Congressional candidate and Republican National Committee member Diane Tebelius. None of those chose to enter the race.  Republican leaders finally got behind former Safeco Insurance CEO Mike McGavick.

Candidates 
 Brad Klippert - U.S. Army Reserves veteran. 2004 Republican primary candidate for U.S. Senate (received 5.72% of the Republican vote) and self-described "God fearing, Bible-believing, Ten Commandment honoring, evangelical Christian."
 Warren E. Hanson - Commercial fisherman and perennial candidate. Ran as a Democrat in the 2004 Senate primary and received 6.04% of the Democratic vote.
 B. Barry Massoudi - Founder, Cubicon management consulting; former chairman, Mercer Island Arts Council.
 Gordon Allen Pross - Ran in the 2004 Republican Senate primary and received 1.59% of the Republican vote.
 William Edward Chovil - Ran in the 2004 Republican Senate primary and received 0.95% of the Republican vote. Running on a platform of opposition to what he refers to as "National and Global Communism and Socialism".
 C. Mark Greene - Legal Assistant and Armed Forces veteran. Won 47% in the 2004 Republican House of Representatives primary (9th District). Emphasizes anti-imperialism platform in his campaigns. Failed to secure ballot access through a lack of filing fee waiver petition signatures. Filed Writ of Mandamus request in Thurston County Superior Court to be admitted to ballot.

Polling

Results 

From the Washington Secretary of State

General election

Candidates

Debates 
McGavick and Cantwell participated in two televised debates; one in Eastern Washington, sponsored by the Spokane Rotary, and another filmed at KING-5 studios in Seattle. Cantwell and McGavick were the only candidates included in the Eastern Washington debate, but Libertarian Bruce Guthrie, who had mortgaged his home and emptied his savings to loan his campaign $1.2 million to meet the debate's invitation requirements, joined them in the Seattle debate.

After failing to meet any of the requirements for an invitation to the Seattle debate, Aaron Dixon attempted to enter the KING-5 studios in order to participate in the debate. Accompanied by around 50 of his supporters, Dixon was prevented from entering the studios by station security and when Dixon refused to leave the building Seattle police were called and Dixon was arrested for investigation of trespassing.

According to the Seattle P-I, Bruce Guthrie won the Seattle debate just by being there. McGavick and Cantwell mainly stuck to their tried and true campaign messages and Guthrie was able to expose his campaign messages to a wide audience, something most third-party candidates are not able to do.

Complete video of debate, October 12, 2006
Complete video of debate, October 17, 2006

Platform

Iraq War 
According to a CBS News poll conducted August 11–13, 28% of Americans feel that the Iraq War as the most important problem facing the country. A November 6 poll conducted by Strategic Vision indicated that 68% of Washingtonians approve of an "immediate withdrawal of United States military forces from Iraq, within six months".

Both McGavick and Cantwell have said that if they knew then what they know now they would have voted against the October 2002 Iraq Resolution, but neither have been completely clear on where they stand on the current presence of US troops in Iraq. When questioned further, McGavick has said that discussing the legitimacy of the war is inappropriate until all the troops come home. Cantwell has declined to apologize for her vote in favor of the resolution and, according to her campaign site, Cantwell still favors U.S. forces remaining in Iraq until they "achieve stability through greater international cooperation".

Cantwell has voted in favor of beginning withdrawal of troops, albeit a non-binding amendment with no timetable for completion (the Levin-Reed Amendment to S.2766), but voted against the Kerry-Feingold Amendment, which would have set a firm deadline of July 2007 for completing a withdrawal. She also co-sponsored an amendment to prohibiting the establishment of permanent US bases in Iraq.

On August 16, the Seattle Times criticized the vagueness of the major party candidates' positions on the war and demanded more clarity. The next day, Stuart Elway, director of The Elway Poll, described Cantwell's and McGavick's positions as "almost identical,".

Democratic primary challenger Tran, the Green Party's Dixon and Libertarian Guthrie all advocated an immediate withdrawal of troops from Iraq.

Minimum wage 
Despite voting against a bill that would have raised the minimum wage, extended sales tax deductions, and cut estate taxes, Cantwell supports an increase in the federal minimum wage. She explained her vote against the bill by noting that the bill would have represented a $5 per hour wage drop for over 120,000 tip workers in Washington and overridden existing state minimum wage laws and was an attempt by the Republican party to pass its estate tax cut bill, which continuously failed to pass on its own in the senate.

McGavick called Cantwell's vote against the bill "profoundly disappointing".

Democratic challenger Tran and the Green Party's Dixon favored raising the national minimum wage to a "living wage". Libertarian Guthrie advocated eliminating the minimum wage laws altogether.

Millionaire Amendment 
On August 11, Mike McGavick loaned his campaign $2 million. Some observers thought that the donation could trigger "millionaire's amendment" of the 2002 Campaign Reform Act which is intended to help candidates compete against wealthy opponents that self-finance their campaigns. The amendment allows supporters of the wealthy candidate's opponents to donate up to $12,600 in the primary and another $12,600 in the general election instead of $2,100 in the primary and general election. The McGavick campaign denied the amendment applies to Cantwell as the loan was made prior to the primary election and would only affect his Republican opponents.

On August 29, the FEC issued a unanimous ruling on the question, saying that the millionaire's amendment was currently only triggered for McGavick's opponents in the primary; however, if either McGavick or Cantwell carry over some of their donations to their own campaign that were made in the primary into the general election, these donations would then trigger the Amendment.

On October 1, Libertarian nominee Bruce Guthrie loaned his campaign nearly $1.2 million, but it is unclear if the loan triggers the amendment for McGavick and Cantwell. Both Cantwell and McGavick have a significant fund raising lead over Guthrie and the amendment might not be triggered in cases where the self-financed candidate is already out funded by their opponents. Guthrie apparently made the loan in order to get himself invited to a televised debate on a western Washington television station and he eventually repaid himself all but $6,000 of the loan.

McGavick's DUI arrest 
The McGavick campaign suffered a setback when on August 24 McGavick claimed on his campaign blog to have been cited in 1993 and charged with driving under the influence of alcohol when he blew a 0.17 in a breath analyzer test, well above the .10 legal limit in Montgomery County, Maryland. However, on September 1, the Everett Herald newspaper uncovered the original police report and disclosed that there was several inaccuracies in McGavick's recount, namely that he actually charged with running a "steady red light", not "cutting a yellow a little close" and he was actually arrested for the DUI, not merely cited. The DUI charge was later removed from McGavick's record, in accordance with Maryland law, after completing an alcohol awareness program, paying a fine, and a year's probation. According to Jennifer Duffy of The Cook Political Report, McGavick's undermined the rationale of his campaign that he was not acting like a typical politician and his omissions caused cynical voters to think he acted like a typical politician.

Fundraising

Predictions

Polling 
Aggregate polls

Hypothetical polling
 with Dunn

 with Nethercutt

 with Rossi

 with Vance

 with White
{| class="wikitable" style="text-align:center"
|- valign= bottom
! Poll source
! 
! 
! 
! style="width:100px;"| MariaCantwell (D)
! style="width:100px;"| RickWhite (R)
! Undecided
|-
| align=left | Strategic Vision (R)
| May 15–17, 2005
| 800 (RV)
| ± 3.0%
|  | 50%
| 37%
| 13%

Results 
Cantwell was projected to be the winner right when the polls closed at 11:00 P.M. EST Time.

From the Washington Secretary of State 2006 General Election Results

See also
 2006 United States Senate elections

Notes

References
General

Specific
 Washington Secretary of State's listing of candidates who have filed for office
 Results of previous elections in Washington State

External links
 Televised Debate between Cantwell, McGavick, and Guthrie

2006 Washington (state) elections
2006
Washington